The Draughts World Championship in international draughts is the world championship, which began in 1885 in France; since 1948, it has been organized by the World Draughts Federation (FMJD). The  men's championship has had winners from the Netherlands, Canada, the Soviet Union, Senegal, Latvia, and Russia.

The championship occurs every two years. Since 1984, a World Title match takes place on every second world championship.

The current men's champion is Alexander Schwartzman.

The first seven mentioned championships (with a *) were international tournaments held in France, they are considered world championships because all leading players were presented in the tournaments.

See also 
List of women's Draughts World Championship winners
World Checkers/Draughts Championship
List of Draughts-64 World Championship winners

References

External links
World Draughts Federation
FMJD list world champions since 1948

Draughts world championships
Draughts competitions